This is a list of live-action or photorealistic remakes produced by Walt Disney Pictures of its animated films. The list also includes the film's sequels and spin-offs within their universe.
This list does not include remakes of live-action/animation hybrid films (such as Pete's Dragon), animated films that were produced by another studio and later adapted as live-action films by Disney, live-action films another studio made based on the same story as a Disney feature, which were later acquired (such as Ever After), or based on animated television shows (such as Kim Possible or Chip 'n Dale: Rescue Rangers).

Released

Upcoming

Other projects
In 2016, Walt Disney Pictures had re-acquired the film rights to The Chronicles of Prydain, on which the animated film The Black Cauldron was based, with the intention to adapt the book series into a live-action film series. The project was in early development at the Walt Disney Studios with no director, producer, or screenwriter attached yet. Since then, there has been no new news about the project.

In January 2022, Jennifer Lee revealed that Stella Meghie, writer and director of Tiana, wanted to develop a live-action adaptation of The Princess and the Frog.

Scrapped projects
A live-action film based on Prince Charming (of Cinderella and other fairy tales), titled Charming, entered development in 2017 with Stephen Chbosky writing and directing. A prequel to Aladdin titled Genies, written by Mark Swift and Damian Shannon and produced by Tripp Vinson, was announced in 2015. In March 2016, the studio announced a new film in development titled Rose Red, a live-action spin-off of Snow White and the Seven Dwarfs which was to be told from the perspective of Snow White's sister, Rose Red. The film was to be produced by Vinson and pitched by Justin Merz, based on a script by Evan Daugherty. 

Alan Menken confirmed that one Disney Classic film, Pocahontas, will not be remade as a live-action adaptation in the near future. According to Menken, it is deemed impossible due to modern sensibilities.

Reception

Box office performance
Many Disney remakes rank along the highest grossing films upon their release; currently, The Lion King (8th), Beauty and the Beast (19th), Aladdin (39th), and Alice in Wonderland (45th) are on the list. The Lion King is also the highest grossing animated film of all time and the highest-grossing musical film of all time. It also set the record for the biggest opening for an animated film and a musical before Frozen II surpassed both records in November that year.

Critical and public response

Academy Award wins and nominations

See also
 List of Walt Disney Animation Studios films
 List of Disney theatrical animated feature films
 List of Walt Disney Pictures films
 Walt Disney Pictures
 Walt Disney Studios Home Entertainment
 List of Disney feature-length home entertainment releases

Notes

References 

Live-action remakes

-
Disney live-action remakes
Disney